Former Iranian president Mohammad Khatami introduced the idea of Dialogue Among Civilizations as a response to Samuel P. Huntington's theory of a Clash of Civilizations. The term was initially used by Austrian philosopher Hans Köchler who in 1972, in a letter to UNESCO, had suggested the idea of an international conference on the "dialogue between different civilizations" (dialogue entre les différentes civilisations) and had organized, in 1974, a first international conference on the role of intercultural dialogue ("The Cultural Self-comprehension of Nations") with the support and under the auspices of Senegalese President Léopold Sédar Senghor.

History
One of the first places where Dialogue Among Civilizations took place was in Isfahan, Iran at the Safa Khaneh Community that was established in 1902. Safa Khaneh was a place that Haj Aqa Nourollah and his older brother made. It was a place where Muslims and Christians talked about their religions with each other. It was one of the first interfaith centres in the world. Later a magazine was published based on the dialogues between Muslims and Christians in the Safa Khaneh and it was released in Iran, India and England. The founder of Safa Khaneh, Haj Aqa Nouroollah was one of the leaders of the Constitution Era in Iran. His house has become a museum named Constitution house of Isfahan.

Introduction
The page dedicated to the United Nations Year of Dialog Among Civilizations introduces the idea as follows:

The Vision
Here are some excerpts from the vision of the Foundation for Dialogue among Civilizations:

The Mission
Here are some excerpts from the mission of the Foundation for Dialogue among Civilizations:

Contrasting view: The Clash of Civilizations

In 1993, Huntington provoked great debate among international relations theorists with the interrogatively-titled "The Clash of Civilizations?", a controversial, oft-cited article published in Foreign Affairs magazine. Its description of post–Cold War geopolitics contrasted with the controversial End of History thesis advocated by Francis Fukuyama.

Huntington expanded "The Clash of Civilizations?" to book length and published it as The Clash of Civilizations and the Remaking of World Order in 1996. The article and the book posit that post–Cold War conflict would most frequently and violently occur because of cultural rather than ideological differences. That, whilst in the Cold War, conflict likely occurred between the Capitalist West and the Communist Bloc East, it now was most likely to occur between the world's major civilizations — identifying seven, and a possible eighth: (i) Western, (ii) Latin American, (iii) Islamic, (iv) Sinic (Chinese), (v) Hindu, (vi) Orthodox, (vii) Japanese, and (viii) the African. This cultural organization contrasts the contemporary world with the classical notion of sovereign states. To understand current and future conflict, cultural rifts must be understood, and culture — rather than the State — mern(?) nations will lose predominance if they fail to recognize the irreconcilable nature of cultural tensions.

Critics (for example, in Le Monde Diplomatique) called The Clash of Civilizations and the Remaking of World Order the theoretical legitimization of American-led Western aggression against China and the world's Islamic cultures. Nevertheless, this post–Cold War shift in geopolitical organization and structure requires that the West internally strengthens itself culturally, by abandoning the imposition of its ideal of democratic universalism and its incessant military interventionism. Other critics argued that Huntington's taxonomy is simplistic and arbitrary, and does not take account of the internal dynamics and partisan tensions within civilizations. Huntington's influence upon U.S. policy has been likened to that of British historian A.J. Toynbee's controversial religious theories about Asian leaders in the early twentieth century.

Personal Representative of the Secretary-General for the UN Year of Dialogue Among Civilizations has said:

Former UN Assistant Secretary-General Giandomenico Picco was appointed the Personal Representative to the Secretary-General for the United Nations Year of Dialogue Among Civilizations in 1999 in order to facilitate discussions on diversity, through organizing conferences, seminars and disseminating information and scholarly materials. Having served the United Nations for two decades, Mr. Picco is most recognized for participating in UN efforts to negotiate the Soviet withdrawal from Afghanistan and in bringing an end to the Iran-Iraq war. He believes that people should take responsibility for who they are, what they do, what they value, and what they believe in.

Related comments
 "A basic change in political ethics is required for the realization of the proposal, The dialog among civilizations." (UNESCO 1999)
 "In order to understand the meaning of the phrase dialogue among civilizations as defined here, one has no choice but to closely pay attention to a number of points one of which is the relationship between a politician and an artist, and the other is the relationship between ethics and politics." (Khatami, UNESCO 1999)
 The Daniel Pearl Dialogue for Muslim-Jewish Understanding is a series of personal yet public conversations between Daniel Pearl's father, Professor Judea Pearl, President of the Daniel Pearl Foundation, and Dr. Akbar Ahmed, Chair of Islamic Studies at American University. The program grew out of Professors Ahmed and Pearl's shared concern about the deterioration of relationships between Muslim and Jewish communities around the world, and their strong belief that reconciliation between these two Abrahamic faiths can be achieved through frank and respectful dialogue. The discussions range from theological issues, historical perceptions to current events. In 2006 Professors Ahmed and Pearl were awarded the first annual Purpose Prize "in recognition of [their] simple, yet innovative approach to solving one of society's most pressing problems." Professor Judea Pearl is a well-known computer scientist, and the President of the Daniel Pearl Foundation.
"Dear President Khatami...I welcome your call for a dialogue between Islamic and Judeo-Christian civilizations because I believe that tensions between these two great world civilizations represent the most significant foreign policy challenge for the world community as we enter the twenty-first century." Excerpt from "An American Citizen Replies" (letter by Anthony J. Dennis to Iranian President Khatami dated August 18, 2000) published in the book Letters to Khatami: A Reply To The Iranian President's Call For A Dialogue Among Civilizations. To date, this book, published and released on July 1, 2001, is the only published reply the now-former Iranian President Khatami has ever received from the West in response to Khatami's call for such a dialogue in an exclusive, hour-long interview on CNN with CNN Foreign Correspondent Christiane Amanpour broadcast in North America on January 7, 1998.

See also
 Alliance of Civilizations
 Centre for Dialogue
 Dialogue of Civilizations
 Fethullah Gülen
 Institute for Interreligious Dialogue
 Interfaith dialogue
 KAICIID Dialogue Centre
 Parliament of the World's Religions
 World Against Violence and Extremism

Notes

References

 Hans Köchler, Philosophical Foundations of Civilizational Dialogue. International Seminar on Civilizational Dialogue (3rd: 15–17 September 1997: Kuala Lumpur), BP171.5 ISCD. Kertas kerja persidangan / conference papers. Kuala Lumpur: University of Malaya Library, 1997.
 Hans Köchler, Unity in Diversity: The Integrative Approach to Intercultural Relations. UN Chronicle, Vol. XLIX, No. 3, September 2012.

External links
 Foundation for Dialogue among Civilizations in Geneva, the official website which includes various news and speeches
 United Nations: Background of Dialogue Among Civilizations
 UNESCO's contribution to Dialogue Among Civilizations
 United Nations Year of Dialogue Among Civilizations
 UNESCO's actions for the Dialogue among Civilizations
 UN Chronicle 2006, Interview with Khatami, five years after the UN 2001 Year of Dialogue Among Civilizations
 International Progress Organization 
 Daniel Pearl Foundation
 An Overview of Sino-Tibetan Dialogue
 World Public Forum "Dialogue of Civilizations"

International relations theory
Mohammad Khatami
Interfaith dialogue
Modern civilizations
Interculturalism
Political neologisms
Foreign policy strategies in the Islamic Republic of Iran